The Meiktila University of Economics, located in Meiktila, Mandalay Region, is one of three universities of economics and business in Myanmar. The institute offers undergraduate and graduate degrees and diplomas, mostly in commerce, statistics and economics. It also has a small number of graduate degree programs, including a full-time MBA and MPA program as well as Ph.D. Programs.

See also
 Yangon Institute of Economics
 Monywa Institute of Economics

References

Universities and colleges in Meiktila
Universities and colleges in Mandalay Region
Business schools in Myanmar
Universities and colleges in Myanmar